Cecilie Løvdal (born 29 August 1998) is a Norwegian handball player who plays for SønderjyskE Håndbold. 

She has previously played for IK Grane of Arendal, and for Gjerpen IF in Norwegian Eliteserien.

In April 2020, she signed a one-year contract with the Danish League club Ajax København, however, shortly after in August 2020 she had re-signed to SønderjyskE Håndbold.

References

1998 births
Living people
People from Arendal
Norwegian female handball players
Sportspeople from Agder
21st-century Norwegian women